Howard Wang (born April 28, 1993) is an American voice actor, known for his work in anime dubs for Funimation and Bang Zoom! Entertainment.

Filmography

Anime series

Animated series

Films

Video games

References

External links
 
 

1993 births
21st-century American male actors
American male video game actors
American male voice actors
Living people